Vaganovo is a rural locality (a village) in Kurilovskoye Rural Settlement, Sobinsky District, Vladimir Oblast, Russia. The population was 23 as of 2010.

Geography 
Vaganovo is located on the Vezhbolovka River, 19 km north of Sobinka (the district's administrative centre) by road. Yurovo is the nearest rural locality.

References 

Rural localities in Sobinsky District